Richard Edward Lyth (1916-2005) was an Anglican bishop in Uganda: he served as the inaugural Bishop of Kigezi.

Lyth was born in York and educated at Uppingham School and St Edmund Hall, Oxford. He was a CMS missionary in Sudan from 1938 and a military chaplain from 1943. He was ordained deacon in 1956 and priest in 1957. After a curacy in Arthuret he went out to Uganda where he was Headteacher of Kigezi High School until his elevation to the episcopate. He served as bishop from 1967 to 1972.

References

People from York
20th-century Anglican bishops in Uganda
Anglican bishops of Kigezi
1916 births
2005 deaths
People educated at Uppingham School
Alumni of St Edmund Hall, Oxford